The Präsidium of the Bundesrat in Germany is responsible for various functions, including the Bundesrat's budget allocation and other internal matters. The current President of the Bundesrat is Reiner Haseloff, the Minister President of Saxony Anhalt, whose one-year term started on 1 November 2020. The president convenes and chairs plenary sessions of the body and is formally responsible for representing the Bundesrat of Germany. The president is aided by two vice-presidents who play an advisory role and deputise in the president's absence. The three constitute the Präsidium of the Bundesrat.

If the office of Federal President of Germany is vacant, the President of the Bundesrat serves as acting Federal President.

References

Legislative branch of the Government of Germany